De La Salle High School is a private, Catholic secondary school run by the Institute of the Brothers of the Christian Schools in New Orleans, Louisiana. The school's campus is located at the picturesque St. Charles Avenue in uptown New Orleans, near the Audubon/University District. It was founded by the De La Salle Brothers in 1949. De La Salle High School offers grades 8 through 12. The school is affiliated with the Lasallian mission, and functions within the school system of the Roman Catholic Archdiocese of New Orleans.

Lasallian heritage
De La Salle High School is named after St. Jean-Baptiste de La Salle, the founder of the Institute of the Brothers of the Christian Schools, (the "French Christian Brothers"). De La Salle High School is a Lasallian education institution.

Brief history of De La Salle High School
De La Salle High School opened in September 1949 with a freshman class of 74 boys. The founding faculty/staff of the school included four De La Salle Christian Brothers: Brother Ernest Cocagne (De La Salle's first principal), Brother August Faure, Brother John Devine, and Brother Francis Vesel. Classes were initially held in a large old home (which also served as the residence for the De La Salle Brothers) on Pitt Street, but, in 1951, De La Salle High School moved to the present building on St. Charles Avenue.

A number of additions to the school's physical plant have been made over the years. These additions have included a wing of eight classrooms on Leontine Street (1957), a gymnasium (1961), a student chapel (1961), the Brother Arsenius Center (1980), the Buck Seeber Health and Fitness Center (2003), the Life Sciences Center (2008), and the Shane and Holley Guidry Baseball and Softball Complex (2009).

De La Salle High School, which was initially an all-boys school, became coeducational in 1992.

An interesting point regarding the school's history is that De La Salle High School was the first high school to open in New Orleans following Hurricane Katrina. The school opened its doors to high school students from schools all across the city and surrounding areas.

Athletics
De La Salle High School athletic programs compete as a member of the Louisiana High School Athletic Association (LHSAA). 

De La Salle has 17 sports teams: 10 boys' teams and 7 girls' teams.

Athletic facilities
De La Salle High School built the Shane and Holley Guidry Batting facility for baseball and softball. The facility has two batting cages with two pitching simulators. The complex also has an area for golf and tennis.

In popular culture
On the TV show American Horror Story: Coven, a hairdresser for Marie Laveau states that her son had his first day at De La Salle.

Notable alumni

 John Arthurs - Former NBA player - '65
 Lance Dunbar - NFL running back; attended but did not graduate from De La Salle High School (displaced by Hurricane Katrina)
 Robert M. Groves - Sociologist, former United States Census Bureau Director - '66
 John Hainkel - Served as both Louisiana Speaker of the House and Louisiana Senate President (deceased)
 Karl Hankton - Former NFL wide receiver
 Marquise Hill - Former NFL player (deceased)
 Chris Horton - Former NFL player
 Tad Jones - Author, music historian, and founder of Tipitina's
 Jim Letten - Former U.S. Attorney Eastern District of Louisiana - '71
 Stanley Lombardo - Classicist, translator (Aeneid, Iliad, and Odyssey) - '61
 Gregory A. Miller - Member of the Louisiana House of Representatives from St. Charles Parish - graduated c. '80 
 Al Montreuil - Former Major League Baseball player
 Mark Normand - Stand-up comedian and actor.
 Paul Pastorek - Attorney, former Louisiana State Superintendent of Education
 Kenneth Allen Polite, Jr. - Former U.S. Attorney Eastern District of Louisiana - '93
 Duane Reboul - American basketball coach, also coached at De La Salle High School
 Dawn Angelique Richard from MTV's hit show Making the Band, Danity Kane
 Thomas John Rodi - Archbishop of Mobile - '67
 Tom Schedler - Former Secretary of State of Louisiana - '67
 Gene Taylor - Former U.S. Congressman for Mississippi - '71
 David Vitter - Former U.S. Senator from Louisiana - '79
 Jeffrey Vitter - Computer scientist, former chancellor at University of Mississippi
 Jay Weigel - Arts administrator, composer
 Frank Wills - Former Major League Baseball player (deceased)

Notes and references

External links 
 De La Salle High School official website.
 NOLA.COM Sports Center: De La Salle High School 
 NOLA.COM: De La Salle High School in the New Orleans local news
 Videos about De La Salle High School 
 De La Salle High School Photo Gallery

Lasallian schools in the United States
Private middle schools in New Orleans
Private high schools in New Orleans
Catholic secondary schools in New Orleans
Educational institutions established in 1949
1949 establishments in Louisiana